Ekta Kaul (born 16 May 1987) is an Indian actress who mainly works in Hindi television. She is best known for her portrayal of Sahiba Agarwal in Rab Se Sohna Isshq, Dr. Suhani Malhotra in Bade Acche Lagte Hain and Riya Mathur in Mere Angne Mein. She participated in Jhalak Dikhhla Jaa 6 in 2013.

Early life
Ekta Kaul was born in Jammu and Kashmir in India. She completed her graduation in biotechnology and went on to get an MBA. She was working with Nestle for a while, and whilst she was posted in Mumbai, she started to dabble in acting.

Career
Kaul began her career with the leading role of Sahiba in Rab Se Sohna Isshq, She was a contestant in season 6 of dance reality show Jhalak Dikhhla Jaa. She played the role of Dr. Suhani in Bade Achhe Lagte Hain on Sony Entertainment Television India.

In 2015, she bagged the lead role of Riya Mathur in Star Plus's drama series Mere Angne Mein.

In August 2017, she was confirmed as the new female lead on Life OK show Ghulaam but the show went off air and her entry was eventually scrapped.
Ekta has recently played beutiful role in Sony Liv web series “Tanav”.

Personal life
Kaul speaks English and a little Punjabi. Her mother tongue is Kashmiri. Before becoming an actress, she completed her MBA and worked as a manager with Nestle India.

Kaul dated her Rab Se Sohna Isshq co-star Kanan Malhotra. They were about to get married but split up in 2013. She got engaged to actor Sumeet Vyas, of Permanent Roommates fame, and they were married on 15 September 2018. The couple have a son.

Filmography

Films

Television

Web series

Awards and nominations

References

External links
 
 

1987 births
Living people
Indian soap opera actresses
Indian television actresses
Actresses from Jammu and Kashmir
People from Jammu (city)